= Christ the Saviour Church, Riga =

Church building in Riga, Latvia

Christ the Saviour Church
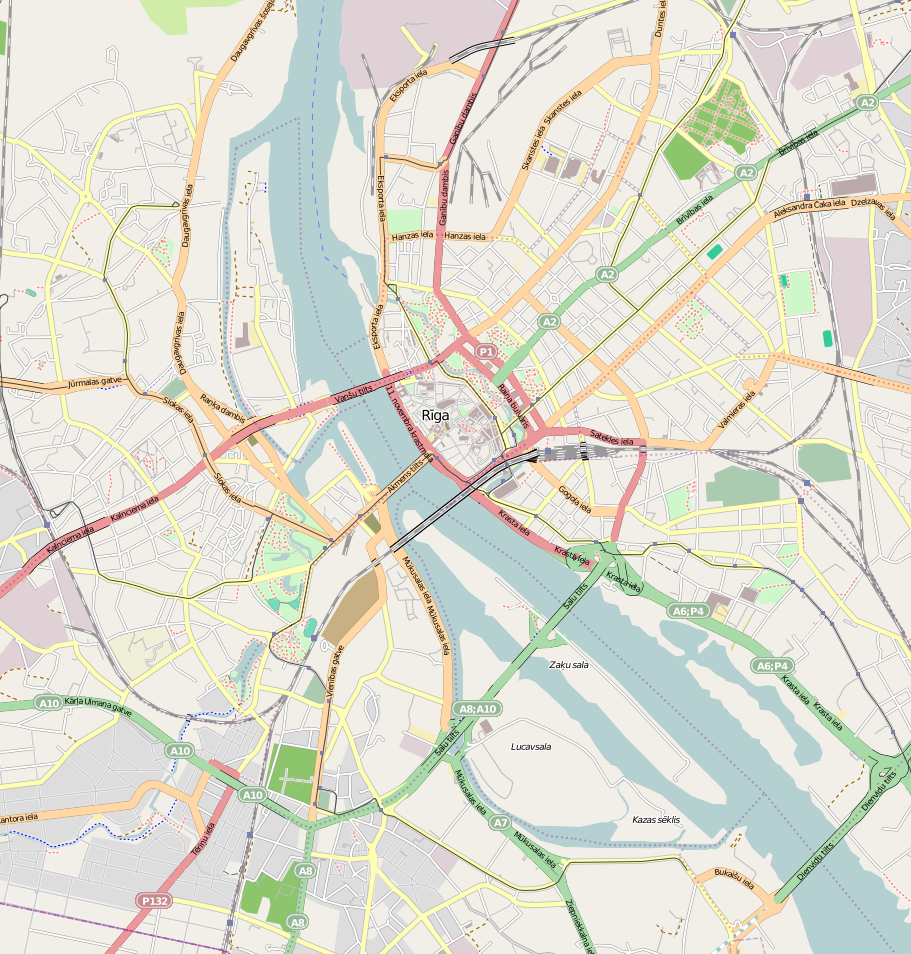
- Location within Riga
- 56°55′13.32″N 24°5′22.26″E
- Location: Riga
- Country: Latvia
- Denomination: Eastern Orthodox

Christ the Saviour Church (Latvian: Kristus Pestītāja svētbildes pareizticīgo baznīca) is an Eastern Orthodox church in Riga, the capital of Latvia. The church is situated at 76 Vienības Street.
